Live at Apollo is a video release, released as a DVD  from Finnish band Brother Firetribe. It is the first and only video release from Brother Firetribe.

The filming took place on 15 April 2009 at Apollo Club in Helsinki, Finland.

Track listing 
Who Will You Run to Now
Runaways
Wildest Dreams
Midnight Queen
Game They Call Love
One Single Breath
Play It from the Heart
Chasing the Angels
Going Out with a Bang
Break Out
I'm on Fire
Heart Full of Fire
Valerie
I am Rock

2009 video albums